The second season of Saturday Night Live, an American sketch comedy series, originally aired in the United States on NBC from September 18, 1976 to May 21, 1977.

History
Following the cancellation of ABC's Saturday Night Live with Howard Cosell, NBC changed the name of the show from NBC's Saturday Night to its current title, Saturday Night Live, for the 17th episode of this second seasonthe episode hosted by Jack Burns on March 26, 1977.
The name change was not made permanent until season 3.

The shows on October 16, October 23, and October 30 1976 were live from NBC's studio complex in Brooklyn, NY. NBC News used Studio 8-H for Presidential election coverage.

This season was the last to feature The Muppets in The Land of Gorch, who had appeared in segments that were unpopular with fans and the SNL writers. Jim Henson was reportedly displeased with the amount of creative control he had over the scripts. Jerry Juhl called Henson "very frustrated" with his input into the scripts, and said the SNL writers "didn't have any real handle" on Henson's concept. "Jim would come in with ideas, and sit with them, and give them wonderful ideas, and they wouldn't know how to fly with them," Juhl recalled. In a 1977 interview with Playboy, head writer/performer Michael O'Donoghue referred to the Muppets as "fucking Muppets... little hairy facecloths" made from the refuse after they cleaned up after Woodstock. He also refused to write for them, saying "I don't write for felt". O'Donoghue also had a lynched Big Bird hanging in the writer's office.

Jim Downey joined the writing staff in what would be a long career on the show.

Buck Henry, Eric Idle and Steve Martin each hosted two episodes.

The season included a Live from Mardi Gras Special.

Cast
During the prior season, cast members George Coe and Michael O'Donoghue had already left the show. Meanwhile, during the season Chevy Chase left the show following an injury, he returned for Weekend Update in a wheelchair for three episodes before leaving pernamently. Jane Curtin took over as Weekend Update anchor. Bill Murray was hired as a replacement for Chevy Chase.

Cast roster
The Not Ready for Prime Time Players
Dan Aykroyd
John Belushi
Chevy Chase (final episode: October 30, 1976)
Jane Curtin
Garrett Morris
Bill Murray (first episode: January 15, 1977)
Laraine Newman
Gilda Radner
bold denotes Weekend Update anchor

Writers

Jim Downey joined the writing staff.

This season's writers included Dan Aykroyd, Anne Beatts, John Belushi, Chevy Chase, Tom Davis, Jim Downey, Al Franken, Bruce McCall, Lorne Michaels, Marilyn Suzanne Miller, Bill Murray, Michael O'Donoghue, Herb Sargent, Tom Schiller, Rosie Shuster and Alan Zweibel. The head writer was Michael O'Donoghue.

Episodes

Special

Home media
The Mardi Gras Special and all 22 episodes were released on a DVD set on December 4, 2007.

References

02
Saturday Night Live in the 1970s
1976 American television seasons
1977 American television seasons